Lieutenant-Colonel Conrad Reginald Cooke, OBE (31 August 1901 – 27 December 1996) was an English early Himalayan mountaineer. In 1935, alone and without oxygen, he reached the summit of Kabru North. His achievement remained the highest solo climb until 1953.

In June 1944 while Director of Line Construction, Posts and Telegraphs, New Delhi, he was appointed an Officer of the Order of the British Empire.

He was emergency commissioned into the Indian Army on the 13 December 1940 and was released as a Major with the honorary rank of Lieutenant-Colonel on 30 November 1946.

References

British mountain climbers
British Indian Army officers
1996 deaths
Indian Army personnel of World War II
Officers of the Order of the British Empire
1901 births